The International Wildlife Film Festival is a film festival held annually at the Roxy Theater in Missoula, Montana.

The International Wildlife Film Festival was "the first regular ongoing festival devoted solely to wildlife films" and this "signaled that wildlife films had arrived as a motion picture genre distinct from others".  It is a juried event that lasts eight days and "involves the world's top wildlife filmmakers, producers, scientists and conservation leaders", and up to 12,000 people attend.  The festival, which was "founded by internationally known bear biologist Dr. Charles Jonkel in 1977, recognizes scientific accuracy, artistic appeal, and technical excellence". Jonkel was described in 1989 as "an appropriately grizzled wildlife biologist acclaimed for his work with bears." He teaches at the University of Montana and "also heads up the Rocky Mountain Film Institute, a project of the non-profit Institute of the Rockies."

Board of directors

Staff 
Executive Director/ Festival Director- Mike Steinberg
Director of Marketing- Chris Sand
Director of Operations and Development- Ingrid Lovitt

References

External links
International Wildlife Film Festival official website.

Documentary film festivals in the United States
Tourist attractions in Missoula, Montana
Film festivals in Montana
Culture of Missoula, Montana
1977 establishments in Montana
Film festivals established in 1977